Linda Moon Redfearn (December 2, 1939 – November 23, 2014) was an American model and actor. She is best known for her appearance as Toma, the wife of Chief Joseph in the 1975 television film I Will Fight No More Forever.

Early and personal life
Linda Moon was born in Dallas, Texas; her father was  Cherokee, and her English-Irish mother was descended from Carrie Nation. After graduating from high school, she modeled for Neiman Marcus for seven years and married Ronnie George Redfearn, with whom she had two sons. After that marriage ended, she moved to Los Angeles to work as the fashion coordinator at an I. Magnin store, and soon began acting full time.

Career

Redfearn's first prominent role was as the "resident Indian" on Rowan & Martin's Laugh-In starting in 1970. She also appeared in The Omega Man and Li'l Abner. Other guest roles include appearances in The Quest, Police Woman, The White Buffalo, and the 1977 miniseries How the West Was Won.

Redfearn also appeared as the wife of Painted Bear in a miniseries that was filmed in 1978 as a prelude for a planned series; the miniseries was shelved and not aired until 1982 as Born to the Wind.

Filmography

References

External links
 

1939 births
2014 deaths
American film actresses
American television actresses
20th-century American actresses
21st-century American women